The Yavapai are a Native American people of central and western Arizona.

Yavapai may also refer to:

 Yavapai-Apache Nation, a federally recognized tribe living near Camp Verde, Arizona
 Yavapai-Prescott Tribe, a federally recognized tribe at Prescott, Arizona
 Fort McDowell Yavapai Nation, a federally recognized tribe living near Scottsdale and Phoenix, Arizona
 Yavapai language, a Yuman language spoken by the Yavapai people
 Yavapai College, a community college in Prescott, Arizona
 Yavapai County in central Arizona
 Yavapai orogeny, a Precambrian mountain-building event